Ian Stuart Gazeley, FAcSS, is an economic historian specialising in poverty and nutrition in Britain.

Career 
He completed an undergraduate degree in Economics and Economic History at the University of Warwick and then a doctorate (DPhil, 1984) in Modern History at St Antony's College, Oxford, with a thesis entitled The standard of living of the working classes, 1881–1912: The cost of living and the analysis of family budgets. He then held a Prize Research Fellowship at Nuffield College, Oxford, before joining the University of Sussex in 1985; until 2018, he was Professor of Economic History there, and has since been an emeritus professor in the History Faculty. In 2016, he was elected a Fellow of the Academy of Social Sciences. In 2018, Gazeley took up a visiting professorship in the Department of Economic History at the London School of Economics.

Publications 
Gazeley's published works include:
  Poverty in Britain, 1900–65, Social History in Perspective Series (Palgrave Macmillan, 2003).
 (edited with Nicholas Crafts and Andrew Newell) Work and Pay in Twentieth-Century Britain (Oxford University Press, 2007).
 "Women's pay in British industry during the Second World War", Economic History Review, vol. 61, no. 3 (2008). pp. 651–671.
 (with Andrew Newell) "Poverty in Edwardian Britain", Economic History Review, vol. 64, no. 1 (2011), pp. 52–71.
 (with Claire Langhamer) "The meanings of happiness in Mass Observation's Bolton", History Workshop Journal, vol. 75, no. 1 (2012), pp. 159–189.
 (with Sara Horrell) "Nutrition in the English agricultural labourer's household over the course of the long nineteenth century", Economic History Review, vol. 66, no. 3 (2013). pp. 757–784.
 (with Andrew Newell) "Urban working-class food consumption and nutrition in Britain in 1904", Economic History Review, vol. 68, no. 1 (2015), pp. 101–122.

Reviews of published books 
Poverty in Britain, 1900–65
 D. J. Oddy for English Historical Review (vol. 56, no. 4 (2003), pp. 798–799).
 Rodney Lowe for Contemporary British History (vol. 19, no. 1 (2005), pp. 97–98).
 John Veit-Wilson for Journal of Social Policy (vol. 33, no. 2 (2004), pp. 340–342).
 In International Review of Social History, (vol. 51, no. 2 (2006), p. 347).
Work and Pay in Twentieth-Century Britain
 Rowan McWilliam for Labour History Review (vol. 74, no. 2 (2009), p. 213).

References 

Alumni of the University of Warwick
Alumni of St Antony's College, Oxford
Academics of the University of Sussex
Fellows of the Academy of Social Sciences